The indie rock band Umbrellas was formed in 2005 by former The Lyndsay Diaries frontman, Scott Windsor. After they fulfilled their contract with The Militia Group, freeing them up to record and release their Beach Front Property EP in June 2007. Their sound is, at times, very mellow and atmospheric, yet can also lean toward a more modern/electro-pop sound.  With their debut album recorded in a pseudo-haunted house, and their second album recorded in an abandoned comedy club, there are auras of emptiness and darkness swirling throughout the music. Their song "The City Lights" was featured during the climax of the Grey's Anatomy episode "Into You Like A Train," and "Ships" was featured during the Grey's Anatomy episode "Great Expectations, as well as the 7th episode of the 1st season of the tv series "Jericho"."

Band members
(Touring)
Scott Windsor (vocals, guitar)
Sammy Sharon (drums)
Nick Hughes (keys)
Sethy McCarroll (bass)
Geordan Taylor (bass)

(Studio)
Scott Windsor (vocals, guitars, percussion)
Sammy Sharon (drums, percussion)
Chad Copelin (producer, keys, guitar, bass, misc)
Eric Arndt (bass)
Jarod Evans (guitar, keys, misc)
Ryan Lindsey (piano, background vocals)
James McAlister (drums, percussion, programming)
Sethy McCarroll (bass)
Nathan Price (drums, percussion)
Costa Stansinopoulos (programming, background vocals)

Discography

Umbrellas (2005)

Umbrellas is the self-titled debut album from the indie rock band Umbrellas released on April 19, 2005 on The Militia Group records.  The track list for the album includes:
 The City Lights
 Sleep Well
 Ghost
 Broken ice
 Emergency
 The Black Dress
 Reactionary
 June, Summer, Rose
 Your Exit
 Vampires
 Comfort In Suffering
 Set The Scene

Illuminare (2006)

Illuminare is the second full-length album from Umbrellas. It was released on July 25, 2006 and produced by Chap Coplin for The Militia Group label.

 Boston White
 Again and Again
 Crooked
 Idle And Waiting
 Angel Or Demon
 Thinking Of You
 Dignified Exit Society
 Tests On My Heart
 Ships
 We Fall

Produced By Chad Copelin and Mixed By Chris Fudurich. 
Appearances from James McAlister (Ester Drang, Pedro The Lion, Sufjan Stevens, etc.) and Ryan Lindsey (Starlight Mints) 
AbsolutePunk.net Review

EP: Beach Front Property (2007)
 Help
 Love
 Beach Front Property
 Walking On Water
 Constants
 Picture Of Departure

External links
 www.umbrellasmusic.com Official website
 www.myspace.com/umbrellas Official MySpace Page
 www.purevolume.com/umbrellas Official Purevolume Page
 www.themilitiagroup.com Most Recent Label Affiliation

Indie rock musical groups from Oklahoma